Geoff Fox (3 May 1910 – 8 August 1971) was an  Australian rules footballer who played with North Melbourne in the Victorian Football League (VFL).

Notes

External links 

1910 births
1971 deaths
Australian rules footballers from Victoria (Australia)
North Melbourne Football Club players
Brunswick Football Club players